Ohio school shooting may refer to:
SuccessTech Academy shooting, 2007
Chardon High School shooting, 2012